The 2016–17 season was Manchester United's 25th season in the Premier League, and their 42nd consecutive season in the top-flight of English football. It began against Leicester City in the FA Community Shield, with United prevailing 2–1 to win the first trophy of the domestic calendar. In February 2017, the club won their second trophy of the campaign, beating Southampton 3–2 in the EFL Cup Final. Although they missed out on qualifying for the 2017–18 UEFA Champions League via the league, having finished in sixth place, a 2–0 victory over Ajax in the 2017 UEFA Europa League Final meant they qualified for the Champions League group stage as Europa League title holders. The triumph also made United the fifth team to have won all three main European club trophies.

Following the departure of Louis van Gaal at the end of the previous season, the club signed former Porto, Chelsea, Inter Milan and Real Madrid manager José Mourinho on a three-year contract, with the option of a further year.

Pre-season and friendlies

United preceded their 2016–17 campaign with a friendly against Wigan, a tour of China, a friendly in Sweden facing Turkish club Galatasaray in the 2016 SuperGame, and Wayne Rooney's testimonial match between Manchester United and Everton at Old Trafford. The season concluded with Michael Carrick's testimonial on 4 June between United players of the 2008 European Double-winning side (plus Dimitar Berbatov, who joined the club during the following transfer window, and Michael's brother, Graeme Carrick) and an all-star team picked by Carrick, both teams respectively managed by Sir Alex Ferguson and Harry Redknapp, Carrick's first manager as a professional footballer.

FA Community Shield

As a result of winning the 2015–16 FA Cup, Manchester United faced Leicester City, who won the 2015–16 Premier League, in their 30th FA Community Shield appearance. Manchester United won the match to claim their 21st Community Shield (including four shared titles).

Premier League

The Premier League season kicked off on 13 August and concluded on 21 May. United went undefeated for a season-record 25 matches between October and May, although 12 of them were draws.

FA Cup

Manchester United entered the FA Cup in the third round with the other Premier League clubs, as well as those from the Championship. The third round draw was made on 5 December and it drew United with a home tie against Championship side Reading, managed by Jaap Stam, who returned to Old Trafford for the first time since leaving United in 2001 after a three-year spell. United cruised to a 4–0 victory on 7 January with first-half goals from Wayne Rooney – who equalled Bobby Charlton's 249-goal record for the club in the process, Anthony Martial and a second-half brace from Marcus Rashford. League One champions Wigan Athletic, managed by Warren Joyce who left his Manchester United Under-23 coaching role in November to join Wigan, were drawn as United's fourth round opponents on 9 January for another home tie. United beat the Latics 4–0 and were subsequently drawn away to Championship side Blackburn Rovers in the fifth round. United came from behind to secure a 2–1 victory, thanks to goals from Marcus Rashford and substitute Zlatan Ibrahimović. In the quarter-finals, United were drawn away to Premier League rivals Chelsea. In a fiercely contested game, Ander Herrera was sent off and N'Golo Kanté scored the winning goal to end Manchester United's defence of the FA Cup.

EFL Cup

As one of seven English clubs who qualified for European competition in the 2015–16 season, United received a bye to the third round of the EFL Cup, the draw for which took place on 24 August 2016. United were drawn away against Northampton Town. The match was played 21 September 2016 and Manchester United won 3–1; Michael Carrick opened the scoring in the 17th minute, but Northampton's Alex Revell equalised from the penalty spot shortly before half-time. However, goals from Ander Herrera and Marcus Rashford midway through the second half secured the win for United. The draw for the fourth round took place shortly after the match and United were drawn at home against rivals Manchester City. The game was played on 26 October 2016 with the Reds winning 1–0 via Juan Mata's goal in the 54th minute.

Manchester United were again drawn at home in the fifth round, this time against West Ham, and United cruised to a 4–1 win, with two goals each for Zlatan Ibrahimović and Anthony Martial. Former Manchester United youth player Ashley Fletcher scored the only goal for the Hammers in the 35th minute. The draw for the semi–finals saw United paired with Hull City. The first leg was played at Old Trafford on 10 January 2017, with Mata and substitute Marouane Fellaini giving United a 2–0 win. Two weeks later, United lost the second leg at the KCOM Stadium 2–1 but progressed to the final 3–2 on aggregate.

Their opponents in the final, played on 26 February, were Southampton, who had beaten Liverpool in the semi-finals. Ibrahimović and Lingard gave United a 2–0 lead, only for Manolo Gabbiadini to level the scores with a goal on either side of the half-time break; however, Ibrahimović scored in the 87th minute to give United a 3–2 victory.

UEFA Europa League

Group stage

As FA Cup winners, United entered the Europa League at the group stage. The draw took place on 26 August 2016 and saw United paired with Turkish league runners-up Fenerbahçe, Dutch cup winners Feyenoord and the fourth-placed team from the Ukrainian league, Zorya Luhansk. They had met Fenerbahçe in Europe twice before (1996–97 and 2004–05) and Feyenoord once before (1997–98). The fixture schedule saw United first head to the Netherlands to play Feyenoord on 15 September, then a home game against Zorya Luhansk two weeks later, followed by a double-header against Fenerbahçe, first at home then away. The programme then closed with the return games against Feyenoord and Zorya Luhansk. Due to the war in Donbass, the away game against Zorya Luhansk was played at Chornomorets Stadium in Odessa.

Knockout phase

The draw for the round of 32 was made on 12 December, with Manchester United drawn against French side Saint-Étienne, who finished top of group C. The tie saw Manchester United midfielder Paul Pogba come up against his elder brother, Florentin, who plays as a defender for the French side. Manchester United's only previous meeting with Saint-Étienne came in the first round of the 1977–78 European Cup Winners' Cup; the second leg was played at Home Park in Plymouth after Manchester United were banned from playing within  of Old Trafford, following crowd trouble at the first leg in Saint-Étienne. The home tie saw Zlatan Ibrahimović score his maiden hat-trick for the club, while a goal from Henrikh Mkhitaryan in the second leg was enough to send United through. In the round of 16, United played Russian side Rostov, winning 2–1 on aggregate. United were drawn against Belgian side Anderlecht in the quarter-finals where Mkhitaryan scored in his fourth consecutive European away game. In the return leg, an extra-time strike from Marcus Rashford sent United into the semi-finals, 3–2 on aggregate. A Rashford strike against semi-final opponents Celta Vigo gave United a first win in Spain since 2010. A 1–1 draw in the return leg secured United's progress 2–1 on aggregate. United faced Dutch side Ajax in the final, with goals from Pogba and Mkhitaryan in either half leading them to victory for their first ever Europa League crown. With this victory, they became only the fifth club to have won all three major European trophies (European Champion Clubs' Cup/UEFA Champions League, UEFA Cup/Europa League, and the now defunct UEFA Cup Winners' Cup). This win also qualified them as the fifth English team in the following season's Champions League.

Squad statistics

Statistics accurate as of 24 May 2017.

Transfers

In

Out

Loan out

Notes

References

Manchester United F.C. seasons
Manchester United
Manchester United
UEFA Europa League-winning seasons